Rockcreek Township is one of nine townships in Wells County, Indiana, United States. As of the 2010 census, its population was 1,579 and it contained 645 housing units.

Geography

Cities, towns, villages
 Markle (east half)
 Uniondale (southwest half)

Unincorporated towns
 Rockford at 
(This list is based on USGS data and may include former settlements.)

Adjacent townships
 Union Township (north)
 Jefferson Township (northeast)
 Lancaster Township (east)
 Harrison Township (southeast)
 Liberty Township (south)
 Salamonie Township, Huntington County (southwest)
 Rock Creek Township, Huntington County (west)
 Union Township, Huntington County (northwest)

Cemeteries
The township contains these three cemeteries: Horeb, Sparks and Spider Hill.

Rivers
 Wabash River

School districts
 Northern Wells Community Schools

Political districts
 Indiana's 6th congressional district
 State House District 82
 State Senate District 19

References
 United States Census Bureau 2007 TIGER/Line Shapefiles
 United States Board on Geographic Names (GNIS)
 IndianaMap
 History of Rockcreek High School, Rockcreek Township

External links
 Indiana Township Association
 United Township Association of Indiana

Townships in Wells County, Indiana
Fort Wayne, IN Metropolitan Statistical Area
Townships in Indiana